Georgina Kennedy (born 3 April 1997) is an English professional squash player. In August 2022, ranked number 8 in the world, she became the first Englishwoman to win a Commonwealth Games squash singles title.

Career
Raised in Beckenham in southeast London, Kennedy attended Langley Park School for Girls and was a promising runner, ranked number one in England for the 1,500m at U12 level, and training with sprint star Dina Asher-Smith at Blackheath and Bromley Harriers. However, having first played squash at the age of 9, she later, aged 13, decided to focus on squash, playing for the ParkLangley club.

In 2015, Kennedy reached the quarter-finals of the 2015 Women's World Junior Squash Championships, and won the European under-19 squash championships in Prague.

Until 2020, Kennedy divided her time between squash and studying at Harvard University where she co-captained the university's Howe Cup-winning women’s team, and won the US National Collegiate Individual Championship (Ramsay Cup) three times, in 2017, 2019 and 2020. In February 2020, she was awarded the 2020 College Squash Association's Betty Richey Award, one of the biggest honours in US college squash.

Following a suspension of competitive squash tournaments during 2020 due to the COVID-19 pandemic, Kennedy began a run of 50 out of 55 tour wins, 11 finals and nine titles in one year. In February 2021, ranked 167 in the world, she reached the final of the English Squash Championships, losing to World No.6 Sarah-Jane Perry. In September 2021, she won the Scottish Open. Then, ranked 51 in the world, Kennedy reached her first PSA World Tour final in October 2021, losing 3-0 to World No.2 Nouran Gohar in the DAC Pro Squash Classic in Detroit.

In June 2022, Kennedy was nominated for the PSA World Tour Women's Player of the Season, having risen from World No.170 to break into the top ten in April 2022, won her first PSA World Tour title in the Bronze-level Cleveland Classic and reached the last 16 of four Platinum tournaments and the World Squash Championships. Her rapid rise to prominence earned comparisons with fellow ParkLangley member, tennis player Emma Raducanu.

On 3 August 2022, Kennedy won gold in the 2022 Commonwealth Games in Birmingham, beating England team-mate (and eventual bronze medallist) Perry in a semi-final and then beating Canada's Hollie Naughton in the final to become the first Englishwoman to win a Commonwealth squash singles title. Paired with Patrick Rooney and Lucy Turmel respectively, Kennedy also competed in the mixed doubles and women's doubles events.

References

1997 births
Living people
People from Beckenham
English female squash players
Harvard Crimson women's squash players
Squash players at the 2022 Commonwealth Games
Commonwealth Games gold medallists for England
Medallists at the 2022 Commonwealth Games